Many artists have written songs about child abuse, which includes emotional, physical, and sexual abuse.

#
 "25 Years", by Pantera
 "13 'N Good", by Boogie Down Productions & KRS-One

A
 "Aawaz - Speak Up Against Sexual Violence", by Jim Ankan Deka
 "A Bachelor For Baden Powell", by Carter The Unstoppable Sex Machine
 "A Day At The Park", by BionicPIG ft. LeonLush
 "Adam Raised a Cain", by Bruce Springsteen
 "Alive", by Pearl Jam
 "All Day Long" , by New Order
 "Alyssa Lies", by Jason Michael Carroll
 "Amelia", by The Mission
"Anna Lee" by Dream Theater
 "Angel", by Blue October
 "Anger Rising", by Jerry Cantrell
 "Ask Me", by Amy Grant
 "Apollo", by Hardwell
 "A Gunshot to the Head of Trepidation, by Trivium

B
 "Baby's Romance", by Chris Garneau
 "Bad Wisdom", by Suzanne Vega
 "Beaten in Lips", by Beartooth
 "Because of You", by Kelly Clarkson
 "Black", by Okkervil River
 "Black Keyboard", by Xiu Xiu
 "Bang my Head against the Wall", by Sia
 "Blind", by Lifehouse
 "Blown Away", by Carrie Underwood
 "The Blue Flashing Light", by Travis
 "Broken Angel", by Boyce Avenue
 "Broken Girl", by Matthew West
 "Broken Home", by 5 Seconds of Summer
 "Brisbane Hotel Sutra", by The Mountain Goats
 "Break The Chain (One-Billion Rising)", by V-day
 "Broom People", by The Mountain Goats
 "Bottle Dreams", by Eyedea
 "Barbarism Begins at Home", by The Smiths

C
 "Camisado", by Panic! at the Disco
 "Candles", by Daughter
 "Candyman", by Siouxsie and the Banshees
 "Cannibal", by Marcus Mumford
 "Carnival", by Natalie Merchant
 "Castle on a Cloud", from Les Misérables
 "Child Called 'It'", by Buckcherry
 "Children Of The Night", by Richard Marx
 "Concrete Angel", by Martina McBride
 "Confessions of a Broken Heart", by Lindsay Lohan
 "Cleanin' Out My Closet", by Eminem
 "Cleaning Out My Closet", by Angel Haze
 "Clown", by Korn
 "Cradle", by Mudvayne 
 "Convex, Concave", by Biffy Clyro
 "Cousin Kevin", by The Who

D
 "Dad" by Nomeansno
 "Daddy", by Korn
 "Daddy" by Badflower
 "Daddy didn't love me", by AJJ
 "Dance Music", by The Mountain Goats
 "Damaged", by Plumb
 "Daughter", by Pearl Jam
 "Day Six: Childhood", by Ayreon
 "Down with the Sickness", by Disturbed
 "Drunk Daddy", by the Cherry Poppin' Daddies
 "Diana" by 3 Lb. Thrill
 "Diary of a Battered Child" by Dystopia
 "Disarm", by Smashing Pumpkins 
 "Dead Babies", by Alice Cooper
 "Devil in a Midnight Mass", by Billy Talent
 "Don't Let Daddy Kiss Me", by Motörhead
 "Daddy's Girl", by Scorpions
 "Dear Mr. Jesus", by PowerSource
 "Dirty Night Clowns", by Chris Garneau

E
 "Enough's Enough", by Alice Cooper
 "Eva", by Nightwish
 "End Of Me", by A Day To Remember
 "Evidence", by Tara MacLean
 "Everyone's Gone to the Movies", by Steely Dan
 "Expose Yourself to Kids", by GG Allin

F
 "Face Down", by The Red Jumpsuit Apparatus
 "Falling Away from Me", by Korn
 "Family Portrait", by P!nk
 "Family Tree", by Megadeth
 "Father", by LL Cool J
"Father", by The Front Bottoms
 "Fee Fi Fo", by The Cranberries
 "Fiddle About", by The Who
 "Fire On Babylon", by Sinéad O'Connor
 "Five", by Machine Head
 "For Adrian (Many Years Ago)", by Jim White
 "For The Love of a Daughter", by Demi Lovato
 "For You", by Staind

G 

 "Ghost", by Funeral for a Friend
 "God Gave Us Life", by Half Man Half Biscuit 
 "God Has a Plan for Us All", by Angtoria

H
 "Hast Thou Considered the Tetrapod", by The Mountain Goats
 "The Day the Aliens Came (Hawaiian Feeling)", by The Mountain Goats
 "He", by Jars of Clay
 "Hell Is for Children", by Pat Benatar
 "Hero", by Superchick
 "His Daughter", by Molly Kate Kestner
 "How Could You Leave Us?", by NF
 "Holy Water", by Big & Rich
 "Howard's Tale", by Sick Puppies
 "Homeless", by Marina Kaye
 "Hopeful", by Bars and Melody
 "Harvester of Sorrow", by Metallica
 "How Could You Leave Us", by NF
 "The Hush", by Hellyeah
 “His Daughter” by Molly Kate Kestner
 "House of Pain" by Faster Pussycat

I
 "I am One of Them", by Aly & AJ
 "I Threw Glass In My Friend's Eyes and Now I'm On Probation", by Destroy Boys
 "I Have a Right" by Sonata Arctica 
 "Innocence", by Seventh Day Slumber
 "In Harm's Way", by Metal Church
 "In Your Care", by Tasmin Archer
 "In the Night", by The Weeknd
 "Insane", by Eminem
 "I'm OK", by Christina Aguilera
 "In a Darkened Room", by Skid Row
 "I'm a Boy", by The Who 
 "I Left My Heart in Papworth General", by Half Man Half Biscuit
 "Independence Day", by Martina McBride

J
 "Janie's Got a Gun", by Aerosmith
 "Jordan, Minnesota", by Big Black
 "Just Like You", by Three Days Grace

K
 "Kristy, Are You Doing Okay?", by The Offspring
 "K.Y.A." by Flotsam and Jetsam

L
 "La La La", by Naughty Boy
 "Leave the Light On", by Beth Hart
 "The Little Girl", by John Michael Montgomery
 "Little House", by The Fray
 "Little Toy Guns", by Carrie Underwood 
 "Lion's Teeth", by The Mountain Goats
 "Luka", by Suzanne Vega
 "Let You Down", by NF
 "Little Susie", by Michael Jackson

M
 "Magdalena", by Frank Zappa and the Mothers
 "Mansion", by NF
"Me and a Gun" by Tori Amos
 "Millie Pulled a Pistol on Santa/Keepin' the Faith", by De La Soul
 "Missed Me", by The Dresden Dolls
 "My Mom", by Eminem
 "Me and Little Andy", by Dolly Parton
 "Mommy", by Mushroomhead
 "Mr. Tinkertrain", by Ozzy Osbourne
 "Must have been the wind", by Alec Benjamin

N
 "Never Again", by Nickelback
 "Never Too Late", by Three Days Grace
 "No Place Like Home", by Mesh 
 "No Son of Mine", by Genesis
 "Nowhere To Stand", by k.d. lang
 "Numb", by Linkin Park
 No Power Over Me (Steve Siler)

O
 "Open Wounds", by Skillet
 "Oh, Father", by Madonna
 "Oh, Mother", by Christina Aguilera
 "Ohio", by Jacob Whitesides
 "One Last Breath", by Creed

P
 "Pale Green Things", by The Mountain Goats
 "Papa", by Prince
"Peruvian Skies" by Dream Theater
 "Petals", by Mariah Carey
 "Planet of the Apes", by Earthling
 "Points of Authority", by Linkin Park
 "Polly", by Nirvana
 "Predictable", by Good Charlotte
 "Pretty", by Korn
 "Prison Sex", by Tool
 "Pushit", by Tool

Q
 "A Question of Time", by Depeche Mode
 "A Quick One, While He's Away", by The Who

R
 "Razor Blade", by Blue October
 "Red Football" by Sinéad O'Connor
 "Remember Everything", by Five Finger Death Punch
 "Rest in Pieces", by Saliva
 "Runaway Love", by Ludacris
 "Runaway Train", by Soul Asylum

S
 "Saturday", by Hedley
 "Sandy Fishnets", by Evelyn Evelyn
 "Shine", by Cold
 "Show Me the Way", by Styx
 "Sleep", by Stabbing Westward
 "Sleep Like a Baby Tonight" , by U2
 "Slide", by The Dresden Dolls
 "Steven", by Jake Miller
 "Suggestion", by Fugazi
 "Superheroes", by The Script
 "Suffer Little Children", by The Smiths

T
 "Tell Me There's a Heaven", by Chris Rea
 "The Ballad of Dwight Fry", by Alice Cooper
"The Childcatcher", by Patrick Wolf
"The Dark I Know Well", by Spring Awakening Cast
 "The Dreadful Hours", by My Dying Bride
 "The Evangelist", by Spawn of Possession
 "The monster", by Insane Clown Posse
 "Three Points on a Compass", by Martin Rossiter
 “This Life Is Mine”, by Jeff Williams
 "This Year", by The Mountain Goats
 "Tier", by Rammstein
 "A Trophy Father's Trophy Son", by Sleeping With Sirens
 "Too Beautiful", by He Is We
 "The Father Who Must Be Killed", by Morrissey
 "The Hand That Rocks The Cradle", by The Smiths
 "The Other Side", by Smile Empty Soul
 "Two Beds and a Coffee Machine", by Savage Garden

U
 "Uncle Jack", by Mötley Crüe
 "Uncle Salty", by Aerosmith
 "Universal Child", by Annie Lennox

W
 "Wash Away Those Years", by Creed
 "What About", by Janet Jackson
 "What's It Gonna Take", by Ronnie McDowell 
 "What's the Matter Here", by 10,000 Maniacs
 "When Did This Storm Begin", by Shiny Toy Guns
 "Wonderful", by Everclear
 "Warrior", by Demi Lovato
 "Well Fancy That", by Fun Boy Three

Y
 "Years Ago", by Alice Cooper
 "You", by Everclear
 "You Knocked the Love (Right Outta My Heart)", by Millie Jackson
 “Yvette”, by Jason Isbell

References

child abuse